The members of the 24th General Assembly of Newfoundland were elected in the Newfoundland general election held in November 1919. The general assembly sat from 1920 to 1923.

The Liberal Reform Party, an alliance between the Liberals and the Fishermen's Protective Union, calling itself Liberal Reform, formed the government. Richard Squires served as Newfoundland's prime minister.

The Newfoundland People's Party, in opposition, adopted the name Liberal-Progressive.

William F. Penney served as speaker.

Sir Charles Alexander Harris served as governor of Newfoundland until 1922. Sir William Allardyce succeeded Harris as governor.

Members of the Assembly 
The following members were elected to the assembly in 1919:

Notes:

By-elections 
By-elections were held to replace members for various reasons:

Notes:

References 

Terms of the General Assembly of Newfoundland and Labrador